Nishan K. P. Nanaiah, known mononymously as Nishan, is an Indian actor who has predominantly worked in Malayalam cinema along with Hindi, Bengali, Kannada,Tamil and Telugu films. Born in Coorg, Karnataka and brought up in Calcutta, Nishan is a graduate of Film and Television Institute of India, Pune.

Personal life

Born Kallichanda Prasad Nishan Nanaiah, Nishan was born to Kallichanda Somaiah Prasad (K. S. Prasad) a customs & central excise officer, and late
K. Padma Prasad, in Coorg, Karnataka. He was brought up in Kolkata, West Bengal. He was a professional tennis player, who represented Calcutta University and played many All India and National tournaments. He did his graduation in Mass communication from St. Xaviers college Kolkata and post graduation (in acting) from the Pune Film Institute (FTII). Nishan speaks six languages, and is very good at picking up languages and dialects.

Career
Nishan debuted in the Hindi film Cycle Kick (Produced by Subhash Ghai), the film did not release in theatres.. It went to film festivals and then got a staggered release.. The rights was then acquired by zee.. film was then shown on zee cinemas and now presently it's there in Zee5.. 
He got a career break in legendary director Shyamaprasad's  Malayalam film Ritu in 2009, (for which he also received great critical acclaim as well as won his Best Debut award), along with a Telugu release Manorama in the same year, opposite lead actress Charmee. He became a notable actor through Sibi Malayil's Apoorvaragam, which was released in 2010, and was one of the biggest commercial hits of that year. It also completed a run of 100 days (which is very rare and a great feat to achieve for a film with newcomers in today's times). Till date Nishan has worked as a LEADING MAN in around 15 Malayalam films, 1 Telugu film, 3 Hindi films, 1 Kannada film, 2 Tamil films, 2 Bengali films and 1 Bengali web series. He is currently shooting for a Hindi feature film Nastik (upcoming film), with Arjun Rampal.

Alma Mater

After graduating, he moved to Mumbai to try his luck in Bollywood. He worked with Subhash Ghai in a film titled Cycle Kick, which was released in 2011. As an actor, he believes in expanding his horizons and hence he decided to venture down south. His first southern break was the Telugu film Manorama (2009). The film, along with Nishan's performance was critically very well acclaimed. His character in the film was noted, however simultaneously. He got a call from legendary Malayalam director Shyamaprasad during those days, for playing the lead role in his film, Ritu (2009). About the selection, the actor said, "Shyamaprasad sir had seen my stills from a model coordinator in Chennai. But I was not sure if I could do the film because Malayalam is a tough language. Shyam sir, however, told me that he was confident that I could do the role." Rithu was a critical hit, which won him the best debut award.

After Ritu, he got another notable role in Sibi Malayil's Apoorvaragam. Apoorvaragam was a sleeper hit. It ran for 100+ days. This movie made Nishan a household name as it was a commercial hit. In February, Ee Adutha Kaalathu released in which he played the role of Rustam. This film received positive response from critics and audiences, and is considered a path-breaker for its bold and realistic narration and the innovative style of weaving story threads together. Nishan's role of Rustam was more appreciated as it had a grey shade. He also starred in Bejoy Nambiar's David alongside Vikram. His role of Peter was appreciated by the critics.
His last release was Geethaanjali (Malayalam) directed by Priyadarshan, starring Mohanlal. The film went on to be a semi hit.

Nishan's forthcoming release is Badlapur Boys (Hindi) directed by newcomer Shailesh Verma. It is based on the Indian traditional rural sport, kabaddi.

Filmography

Television
2011 - Vivel Big Break (Surya TV) as Judge (Malayalam)

Awards 
 Asianet Film Award for Best New Face (2009)
 Surya Film Award for Best Debutant (2009)
 World Malayalee Council and Kairali TV award for Best Debut (2009)

References

External links 
 
 Nishan at Oneindia.in
 Nishan at Metromatinee.com
 Nishan at Cinecurry.com

Male actors in Malayalam cinema
Indian male film actors
Male actors from Karnataka
People from Kodagu district
Living people
Kodava people
1985 births
21st-century Indian male actors
Male actors in Telugu cinema
Male actors in Tamil cinema